Baba Rud (also Romanized as Bābā Rūd; also known as Bābāru) is a village in Jowkar Rural District, Jowkar District, Malayer County, Hamadan Province, Iran. At the 2006 census, its population was 344, in 76 families.

References 

Populated places in Malayer County